Kokbesh (Kök-Paş) is a rural locality (a selo) in Ulagansky District, the Altai Republic, Russia. The population was 33 as of 2016. There is 1 street.

References 

Rural localities in Ulagansky District